Kaistia terrae is a bacterium from the genus of Kaistia which has been isolated from wetland soil from Yongneup in Korea.

References

External links
Type strain of Kaistia terrae at BacDive -  the Bacterial Diversity Metadatabase	

Hyphomicrobiales
Bacteria described in 2010